The 2012 CIS/CCA Curling Championships were held from March 14 to 18 at the Welland Curling Club in Welland, Ontario. The host university of the event was Brock University, located in nearby St. Catharines. The winners of the event, the teams from the University of Alberta and from Wilfrid Laurier University skipped by Brendan Bottcher and Laura Crocker, respectively, will go on to represent Canada at the 2013 Winter Universiade in Trentino, Italy.

Eight teams of each gender competed at the championships, including two from Western Canada, two from Atlantic Canada, and three from Ontario, including the hosts, Brock University. Quebec held one spot each in the men's and women's championships, but chose not to use their entries, so the spots were filled by a team from Western Canada on the men's side and a team from Ontario on the women's side. The format was the same as the previous year's format; the teams competed in a round robin, and at the conclusion of the round robin, the first place team received a bye straight through to the final, and the second and third place teams played for the second spot in the final.

Men

Teams
The teams are listed as follows:

Round-robin standings
Final round-robin standings

Round-robin results
All times listed in Eastern Standard Time (UTC−5).

Draw 1
Wednesday, March 14, 7:00 pm

Draw 2
Thursday, March 15, 9:00 am

Draw 3
Thursday, March 15, 2:00 pm

Draw 4
Thursday, March 15, 8:00 pm

Draw 5
Friday, March 16, 2:00 pm

Draw 6
Friday, March 16, 7:00 pm

Draw 7
Saturday, March 17, 9:00 am

Playoffs

Semifinal
Saturday, March 17, 7:00 pm

Final
Sunday, March 18, 2:00 pm

Women

Teams
The teams are listed as follows:

Round-robin standings
Final round-robin standings

Round-robin results
All times listed in Eastern Standard Time (UTC−5).

Draw 1
Wednesday, March 14, 8:00 pm

Draw 2
Thursday, March 15, 10:00 am

Draw 3
Thursday, March 15, 3:00 pm

Draw 4
Thursday, March 15, 8:00 pm

Draw 5
Friday, March 16, 2:00 pm

Draw 6
Friday, March 16, 7:00 pm

Draw 7
Saturday, March 17, 9:00 am

Tiebreaker
Saturday, March 17, 2:00 pm

Playoffs

Semifinal
Saturday, March 17, 7:00 pm

Final
Sunday, March 18, 2:00 pm

Awards
The all-Canadian teams and award winners are as follows:

CIS All-Canadian Teams
Women
First Team
Skip: Laura Crocker, Wilfrid Laurier University
Third: Sarah Wilkes, Wilfrid Laurier University
Second: Jen Gates, Wilfrid Laurier University
Lead: Cheryl Kreviazuk, Wilfrid Laurier University

Second Team
Skip: Joanne Curtis, Brock University
Third: Jessica Corrado, Brock University
Second: Krysten Karwacki, University of Manitoba
Lead: Erica Trickett, Memorial University

Men
First Team
Skip: Jake Walker, University of Waterloo
Third: Edward Cyr, University of Waterloo
Second: Brad Thiessen, University of Alberta
Lead: Karrick Martin, University of Alberta

Second Team
Skip: Brendan Bottcher, University of Alberta
Third: Mick Lizmore, University of Alberta
Second: Geoff Chambers, University of Waterloo
Lead: Connor MacPhee, University of Prince Edward Island

R.W. Pugh Fair Play Awards
Women
Julie Devereaux, Memorial University

Men
Joshua Drews, University of Winnipeg

CIS Coach of the Year
Women
Maurice Wilson, Wilfrid Laurier University
Men
Len Komyshyn, University of Winnipeg

See also
Curling
Canadian Curling Association
University and college curling
2013 Winter Universiade

References

External links
Home page

CIS CCA Curling Championships, 2012
CIS CCA Curling Championships
CIS CCA Curling
Curling in Ontario
CIS/CCA Curling Championships